Joshua Waitzkin (born December 4, 1976) is an American former chess player, martial arts competitor, and author. As a child, he was recognized as a prodigy, and won the U.S. Junior Chess championship in 1993 and 1994. The film Searching for Bobby Fischer is based on his early life.

Early life and education
Waitzkin first noticed the game of chess being played while walking with his mother in New York City's Washington Square Park at the age of six. At age seven, Waitzkin began studying the game with his first formal teacher Bruce Pandolfini. During his years as a student at Dalton he led the school to win seven national team championships between the third and ninth grades, in addition to his eight individual titles. In 1999, Waitzkin enrolled at Columbia University, where he studied philosophy.

At ten years old, Waitzkin played a notable game featuring a sacrifice of his queen and rook in exchange for a checkmate six moves later.  At 11, Waitzkin and fellow prodigy K. K. Karanja were the only two children to draw with World Champion Garry Kasparov in an exhibition event where Kasparov played simultaneously against 59 youngsters. At age 13, he earned the title of National Master, and at age 16 became an International Master.

Waitzkin has not played in a US Chess Federation tournament since 1999, and his last FIDE tournament was before 2000. Waitzkin has also stated in an interview his reasoning for leaving chessWhen people ask me why I stopped playing chess … I tend to say that I lost the love. And I guess if I were to be a little bit more true, I would say that I became separated from my love; I became alienated from chess somewhat … The need that I felt to win, to win, to win all the time, as opposed to the freedom to explore the art more and more deeply, and I think that started to move me away from the game and also chess for me was so intimate. It was something that I loved so deeply that when I started to become alienated from it, I couldn't do it in an impure way.

Film portrayal
The script for Paramount Pictures' 1993 film Searching for Bobby Fischer (released in the United Kingdom as Innocent Moves) was based on a 1988 book by Waitzkin's father, Fred Waitzkin: Searching for Bobby Fischer: The Father of a Prodigy Observes the World of Chess. Waitzkin makes a cameo in the film, in a scene in the last quarter of the movie (at 1:21:52) where his father is watching a young Josh play Vinnie (Laurence Fishburne) from a bench. The real Waitzkin (16 years old at that time) can be seen wearing a black jacket/white hoodie playing chess right next to the film's version of Waitzkin and is sitting across from Josh's father (Joe Mantegna).

Author
Waitzkin is the author of two books: Attacking Chess:  Aggressive Strategies, Inside Moves from the U.S. Junior Chess Champion (1995) and The Art of Learning: An Inner Journey to Optimal Performance (2008),  an autobiographical discussion of the learning process and performance psychology drawn from Waitzkin's experiences in both chess and the martial arts. He is also the spokesperson for the Chessmaster video game series, and is featured in the game giving advice and game analysis.

Waitzkin has a chapter giving advice in Tim Ferriss' book Tools of Titans.

Martial arts
As a young adult, Waitzkin's focus shifted to the martial art Taiji.  He holds several US national medals and a 2004 world champion title in the competitive sport of Taiji Push Hands (Taiji Tui Shou).  Waitzkin also became a championship coach, leading Grandmaster William C. C. Chen's US Push Hands Team to several titles at the Tai Chi World Cup in Taiwan, guiding teammates Jan Lucanus and Jan C. Childress to their world titles. Waitzkin is also a black belt in Brazilian Jiu-Jitsu under world champion and Brazilian Jiu-Jitsu phenomenon Marcelo Garcia. Waitzkin is the co-founder of MGInAction.com and The Marcelo Garcia Academy, a Brazilian jiu-jitsu school located in New York City.

Personal life
On April 23, 2010, Waitzkin married Desiree Cifre, a screenwriter and former contestant on The Amazing Race.

See also
 List of Jewish chess players

References

External links

 
 "Chess Champion Offers Success Strategies for Life" audio interview by NPR on May 14, 2007 about the book The Art of Learning
 The Art of Learning Project
 Interviews with Josh Waitzkin
 Edward Winter, Searching for Bobby Fischer (Joshua Waitzkin)

1976 births
American chess players
20th-century American Jews
American chess writers
American male non-fiction writers
American non-fiction writers
American martial artists
Jewish martial artists
Chess International Masters
Dalton School alumni
Columbia College (New York) alumni
Living people
Jewish chess players
21st-century American Jews